The 1949–50 New York Rangers season was the franchise's 24th season. The season saw the Rangers finish in fourth place in the National Hockey League (NHL) with a record of 28 wins, 31 losses, and 11 ties for 67 points. They upset the Montreal Canadiens in five games in the Semi-finals before losing a close seven-game Stanley Cup Finals to the Detroit Red Wings. The team reached double-overtime of the seventh game of the Finals before Detroit's Pete Babando scored to give the Red Wings the Cup. The Rangers would not win another playoff series again until 1971.

Also of note during this season was that the Rangers were forced to use Maple Leaf Gardens in Toronto, the home ice of the Toronto Maple Leafs, as their "home ice" during the Stanley Cup Finals, as the Ringling Brothers Barnum and Bailey Circus was then at Madison Square Garden. Garden management found that they could make more money having the circus at the Garden instead of the Rangers. Moreover, at the time, arenas could not be configured to host a circus and a hockey game on the same day, thus forcing the shift in venue.

The Rangers would not reach the Stanley Cup Finals again until 1972.

Regular season

Final standings

Record vs. opponents

Schedule and results

|- align="center" bgcolor="#FFBBBB"
| 1 || 15 || @ Montreal Canadiens || 3–1 || 0–1–0
|- align="center" bgcolor="white"
| 2 || 16 || @ Boston Bruins || 2–2 || 0–1–1
|- align="center" bgcolor="#FFBBBB"
| 3 || 19 || @ Detroit Red Wings || 6–1 || 0–2–1
|- align="center" bgcolor="white"
| 4 || 22 || @ Toronto Maple Leafs || 2–2 || 0–2–2
|- align="center" bgcolor="#CCFFCC"
| 5 || 25 || @ Chicago Black Hawks || 2–1 || 1–2–2
|- align="center" bgcolor="#CCFFCC"
| 6 || 26 || Boston Bruins || 5–2 || 2–2–2
|- align="center" bgcolor="#FFBBBB"
| 7 || 29 || Chicago Black Hawks || 2–0 || 2–3–2
|- align="center" bgcolor="#FFBBBB"
| 8 || 30 || Toronto Maple Leafs || 4–2 || 2–4–2
|-

|- align="center" bgcolor="white"
| 9 || 2 || @ Toronto Maple Leafs || 3–3 || 2–4–3
|- align="center" bgcolor="#FFBBBB"
| 10 || 6 || @ Detroit Red Wings || 7–0 || 2–5–3
|- align="center" bgcolor="white"
| 11 || 9 || Montreal Canadiens || 2–2 || 2–5–4
|- align="center" bgcolor="#FFBBBB"
| 12 || 12 || Montreal Canadiens || 5–3 || 2–6–4
|- align="center" bgcolor="white"
| 13 || 13 || Detroit Red Wings || 1–1 || 2–6–5
|- align="center" bgcolor="#CCFFCC"
| 14 || 16 || Boston Bruins || 2–1 || 3–6–5
|- align="center" bgcolor="#CCFFCC"
| 15 || 20 || @ Chicago Black Hawks || 5–2 || 4–6–5
|- align="center" bgcolor="#FFBBBB"
| 16 || 23 || @ Detroit Red Wings || 4–3 || 4–7–5
|- align="center" bgcolor="#FFBBBB"
| 17 || 26 || @ Montreal Canadiens || 5–1 || 4–8–5
|- align="center" bgcolor="white"
| 18 || 27 || @ Boston Bruins || 1–1 || 4–8–6
|- align="center" bgcolor="#CCFFCC"
| 19 || 30 || Montreal Canadiens || 5–2 || 5–8–6
|-

|- align="center" bgcolor="#FFBBBB"
| 20 || 3 || @ Toronto Maple Leafs || 2–0 || 5–9–6
|- align="center" bgcolor="#CCFFCC"
| 21 || 4 || Chicago Black Hawks || 4–0 || 6–9–6
|- align="center" bgcolor="#CCFFCC"
| 22 || 7 || Chicago Black Hawks || 2–1 || 7–9–6
|- align="center" bgcolor="#CCFFCC"
| 23 || 10 || @ Detroit Red Wings || 1–0 || 8–9–6
|- align="center" bgcolor="#CCFFCC"
| 24 || 11 || Detroit Red Wings || 2–1 || 9–9–6
|- align="center" bgcolor="#FFBBBB"
| 25 || 14 || @ Chicago Black Hawks || 5–3 || 9–10–6
|- align="center" bgcolor="#CCFFCC"
| 26 || 17 || @ Boston Bruins || 3–1 || 10–10–6
|- align="center" bgcolor="#FFBBBB"
| 27 || 18 || Toronto Maple Leafs || 2–0 || 10–11–6
|- align="center" bgcolor="#CCFFCC"
| 28 || 21 || Montreal Canadiens || 4–1 || 11–11–6
|- align="center" bgcolor="white"
| 29 || 24 || @ Montreal Canadiens || 0–0 || 11–11–7
|- align="center" bgcolor="#CCFFCC"
| 30 || 25 || Toronto Maple Leafs || 3–1 || 12–11–7
|- align="center" bgcolor="#CCFFCC"
| 31 || 28 || Chicago Black Hawks || 5–2 || 13–11–7
|- align="center" bgcolor="#CCFFCC"
| 32 || 31 || Boston Bruins || 4–1 || 14–11–7
|-

|- align="center" bgcolor="#FFBBBB"
| 33 || 1 || @ Boston Bruins || 6–0 || 14–12–7
|- align="center" bgcolor="#CCFFCC"
| 34 || 4 || Detroit Red Wings || 2–1 || 15–12–7
|- align="center" bgcolor="#CCFFCC"
| 35 || 7 || @ Montreal Canadiens || 3–1 || 16–12–7
|- align="center" bgcolor="white"
| 36 || 8 || Chicago Black Hawks || 1–1 || 16–12–8
|- align="center" bgcolor="#FFBBBB"
| 37 || 11 || Toronto Maple Leafs || 2–1 || 16–13–8
|- align="center" bgcolor="#FFBBBB"
| 38 || 14 || @ Detroit Red Wings || 4–2 || 16–14–8
|- align="center" bgcolor="#FFBBBB"
| 39 || 15 || Detroit Red Wings || 1–0 || 16–15–8
|- align="center" bgcolor="#FFBBBB"
| 40 || 18 || Boston Bruins || 4–2 || 16–16–8
|- align="center" bgcolor="#FFBBBB"
| 41 || 21 || @ Toronto Maple Leafs || 2–1 || 16–17–8
|- align="center" bgcolor="#FFBBBB"
| 42 || 22 || @ Chicago Black Hawks || 4–3 || 16–18–8
|- align="center" bgcolor="#FFBBBB"
| 43 || 25 || @ Toronto Maple Leafs || 5–1 || 16–19–8
|- align="center" bgcolor="white"
| 44 || 28 || @ Boston Bruins || 2–2 || 16–19–9
|- align="center" bgcolor="#CCFFCC"
| 45 || 29 || Montreal Canadiens || 2–0 || 17–19–9
|-

|- align="center" bgcolor="#FFBBBB"
| 46 || 1 || @ Boston Bruins || 3–2 || 17–20–9
|- align="center" bgcolor="#FFBBBB"
| 47 || 2 || @ Montreal Canadiens || 4–1 || 17–21–9
|- align="center" bgcolor="white"
| 48 || 5 || @ Detroit Red Wings || 5–5 || 17–21–10
|- align="center" bgcolor="#CCFFCC"
| 49 || 9 || @ Chicago Black Hawks || 5–3 || 18–21–10
|- align="center" bgcolor="#CCFFCC"
| 50 || 12 || Detroit Red Wings || 4–0 || 19–21–10
|- align="center" bgcolor="white"
| 51 || 15 || Boston Bruins || 2–2 || 19–21–11
|- align="center" bgcolor="#CCFFCC"
| 52 || 18 || @ Montreal Canadiens || 4–2 || 20–21–11
|- align="center" bgcolor="#CCFFCC"
| 53 || 19 || Toronto Maple Leafs || 2–1 || 21–21–11
|- align="center" bgcolor="#CCFFCC"
| 54 || 22 || Chicago Black Hawks || 3–0 || 22–21–11
|- align="center" bgcolor="#CCFFCC"
| 55 || 23 || @ Chicago Black Hawks || 7–3 || 23–21–11
|- align="center" bgcolor="#FFBBBB"
| 56 || 25 || @ Toronto Maple Leafs || 4–2 || 23–22–11
|- align="center" bgcolor="#CCFFCC"
| 57 || 26 || Boston Bruins || 4–3 || 24–22–11
|-

|- align="center" bgcolor="#FFBBBB"
| 58 || 1 || Detroit Red Wings || 5–2 || 24–23–11
|- align="center" bgcolor="#FFBBBB"
| 59 || 4 || @ Boston Bruins || 5–1 || 24–24–11
|- align="center" bgcolor="#CCFFCC"
| 60 || 5 || Toronto Maple Leafs || 5–2 || 25–24–11
|- align="center" bgcolor="#CCFFCC"
| 61 || 8 || @ Chicago Black Hawks || 4–2 || 26–24–11
|- align="center" bgcolor="#CCFFCC"
| 62 || 9 || Detroit Red Wings || 3–1 || 27–24–11
|- align="center" bgcolor="#FFBBBB"
| 63 || 11 || @ Toronto Maple Leafs || 4–0 || 27–25–11
|- align="center" bgcolor="#FFBBBB"
| 64 || 12 || Montreal Canadiens || 5–1 || 27–26–11
|- align="center" bgcolor="#FFBBBB"
| 65 || 15 || Boston Bruins || 4–1 || 27–27–11
|- align="center" bgcolor="#FFBBBB"
| 66 || 18 || @ Montreal Canadiens || 5–3 || 27–28–11
|- align="center" bgcolor="#FFBBBB"
| 67 || 19 || Montreal Canadiens || 4–2 || 27–29–11
|- align="center" bgcolor="#FFBBBB"
| 68 || 21 || Chicago Black Hawks || 6–3 || 27–30–11
|- align="center" bgcolor="#FFBBBB"
| 69 || 22 || @ Detroit Red Wings || 8–7 || 27–31–11
|- align="center" bgcolor="#CCFFCC"
| 70 || 26 || Toronto Maple Leafs || 5–3 || 28–31–11
|-

Playoffs

Stanley Cup Finals
It was the Rangers' first appearance in the Final since their Stanley Cup victory in 1940. Two games were played in Toronto as the circus had taken over Madison Square Garden in New York.
New York's Don Raleigh scored two overtime winners and Detroit's Pete Babando scored the Cup-winning goal in overtime of game seven, the first time ever in which the stanley cup was won in extra frames in game seven. Detroit won the Cup without Gordie Howe, who was injured in the first game of the playoffs. As Stanley Cup runner-up, the Rangers would be awarded the O'Brien Cup, the last team to win the trophy, at one time the National Hockey Association championship trophy, which was retired after the season.

Key:  Win  Loss

Player statistics
Skaters

Goaltenders

†Denotes player spent time with another team before joining Rangers. Stats reflect time with Rangers only.
‡Traded mid-season. Stats reflect time with Rangers only.

Awards and records
 O'Brien Cup: New York Rangers
 Hart Memorial Trophy: Chuck Rayner
 Lady Byng Memorial Trophy: Edgar Laprade
 Tony Leswick, Left Wing, NHL Second Team All-Star
 Chuck Rayner, Goaltender, NHL Second Team All-Star

References

External links
 Rangers on Hockey Database
 Rangers on Hockey-Reference

New York Rangers seasons
New York Rangers
New York Rangers
New York Rangers
New York Rangers
1940s in Manhattan
1950s in Manhattan
Madison Square Garden